The 1882 Nova Scotia general election was held on 20 June 1882 to elect members of the 28th House of Assembly of the Province of Nova Scotia, Canada. It was won by the Liberal Party, their first of ten consecutive wins that would see them retain power until 1925. The Conservatives were the only one-term government in Nova Scotia until 2013 when the NDP lost.

The Liberals did not have a formal leader at the time of the election. After their victory, the newly-elected caucus selected William Thomas Pipes to be Premier.

Results

Results by party

Retiring incumbents
Liberal
Joseph Robbins Kinney, Yarmouth
Thomas Barlow Smith, Hants

Liberal-Conservative
Benjamin Van Blarcom, Digby
Simon Hugh Holmes, Pictou
Edward James, Lunenburg
James S. MacDonald, Kings
Hector Francis McDougall, Cape Breton
John Fitzwilliam Stairs, Halifax
Nathaniel Whitworth White, Shelburne

Nominated candidates
1882 Nova Scotia Provincial Election

Legend
bold denotes party leader
† denotes an incumbent who is not running for re-election or was defeated in nomination contest

Valley

|-
| rowspan="2"|Annapolis
|
|William Botsford Troop1,21223.57%
||
|James Wilberforce Longley1,34026.06%	
|
|
||
|William Botsford Troop
|-
|
|Caleb Shaffner1,26124.52%
||
|Henry M. Munro1,32925.85%	
|
|
||
|Caleb Shaffner
|-
| rowspan="2"|Digby
|
|George Taylor75221.23%
||
|Henri M. Robicheau1,04829.59%	
|
|William Lent922.60%
||
|Henri M. Robicheau
|-
|
|Urbine Doucette66418.75%	
||
|John S. McNeill98627.84%	
|
|
||
|Benjamin Van Blarcom†
|-
| rowspan="2"|Hants
||
|Nathaniel Spence1,23625.05%
|
|Archibald Frame1,20924.50%
|
|
||
|Nathaniel Spence
|-	
|
|F. S. Creelman1,22924.90%
||
|Allen Haley1,26125.55%
|
|
||
|Thomas Barlow Smith†
|-
| rowspan="2"|Kings
||
|Thomas R. Harris1,34524.17%	
|
|C. B. Hickey1,19821.53%
|
|James Lyons3185.71%
||
|James S. MacDonald†
|-	
|
|William C. Bill1,26722.77%
||
|Thomas Lewis Dodge1,43725.82%	
|
|
||
|William C. Bill
|-
|}

South Shore

|-
| rowspan="2"|Lunenburg
|
|Charles A. Smith1,19522.78%	
||
|Charles Edward Church1,53929.34%
|
|
||
|Charles A. Smith
|-
|
|W. R. Calder1,07520.50%
||
|George A. Ross1,43627.38%
|
|
||
|Edward James†
|-
| rowspan="2"|Queens
|
|Leander Ford54822.50%
||
|Joseph H. Cook68928.28%	
|
|
||
|Leander Ford
|-
|
|James C. Bartling55522.78%	
||
|Jason M. Mack64426.44%	
|
|
||
|James C. Bartling
|-
| rowspan="2"|Shelburne
|
|John Allan54717.51%
||
|Thomas Johnston94730.31%	
|
|
||
|Nathaniel Whitworth White†
|-
|
|Nehemiah McGray69222.15%	
||
|William F. MacCoy93830.03%
|
|
||
|Nehemiah McGray
|-
| rowspan="2"|Yarmouth
|
|
||
|Albert Gayton1,34439.26%
|
|
||
|Albert Gayton
|-	
||
|Thomas Corning1,20335.14%	
|
|T. B. Flint87625.59%	
|
|
||
|Joseph Robbins Kinney†
|-
|}

Fundy-Northeast

|-
| rowspan="2"|Colchester	
||
|William Blair1,50724.64%
|
|S. D. McLellan1,38722.68%
|
|Samuel Rettie4747.75%
||
|William Blair
|-	
||
|William Albert Patterson1,49724.48%
|
|W. H. Guild1,25120.45%
|
|
||
|William Albert Patterson
|-
| rowspan="2"|Cumberland
||
|Charles James Townshend1,69024.98%
|
|Charles Smith1,68224.86%
|
|
||
|Charles James Townshend
|-	
|
|Edward Vickery1,51922.45%	
||
|William Thomas Pipes1,87527.71%
|
|
||
|Edward Vickery
|-
|}

Halifax

|-
| rowspan="3"|Halifax
|
|J. F. L. Parsons2,47516.06%
||
|Michael Joseph Power2,59116.82%
|
|
||
|John Fitzwilliam Stairs†
|-
||
|William D. Harrington2,73717.76%
|
|J. G. Foster2,54316.50%
|
|
||
|William D. Harrington
|-	
|
|John Pugh2,50816.28%	
||
|William Stevens Fielding2,55416.58%
|
|
||
|John Pugh
|-
|}

Central Nova

|-
| rowspan="2"|Antigonish
||
|John Sparrow David Thompson1,16641.60%
|
|Joseph McDonald54319.37%	
|
|
||
|John Sparrow David Thompson
|-	
|
|
||
|Angus McGillivray1,09439.03%
|
|
||
|Angus McGillivray
|-
| rowspan="2"|Guysborough
|
|Alexander N. McDonald51819.81%
||
|Otto Schwartz Weeks87133.31%	
|
|
||
|Alexander N. McDonald
|-
|
|Joseph William Hadley41415.83%
||
|John A. Fraser81231.05%	
|
|
||
|Joseph William Hadley
|-
| rowspan="3"|Pictou	
||
|Robert Hockin2,49217.41%
|
|Jeffrey McColl2,41116.84%
|
|
||
|Simon Hugh Holmes†
|-	
||
|Charles H. Munro2,48917.39%
|
|Edward Mortimer MacDonald2,25015.72%
|
|
||
|Vacant
|-	
||
|Adam Carr Bell2,47317.28%
|
|Cornelius Dwyer2,20015.37%	
|
|
||
|Adam Carr Bell
|-
|}

Cape Breton

|-
| rowspan="2"|Cape Breton
|
|Ebenezer Tilton Moseley1,19221.48%	
||
|Alonzo J. White1,60028.83%
|
|
||
|Ebenezer Tilton Moseley
|-
|
|Colin Chisholm1,17821.23%	
||
|William Buchanan1,57928.46%
|
|
||
|Hector Francis McDougall†
|-
| rowspan="2"|Inverness
|
|Angus MacLennan1,38724.70%
||
|Duncan J. Campbell1,43525.55%	
|
|
||
|Duncan J. Campbell
|-	
||
|Alexander Campbell1,47726.30%
|
|John McKinnon1,31723.45%
|
|
||
|Alexander Campbell
|-
| rowspan="3"|Richmond
|
|Neil L. McNeil1508.45%
||
|Isidore LeBlanc53830.31%
|
|
||
|Isidore LeBlanc
|-	
||
|Murdoch McRae40722.93%
|rowspan=2|
|rowspan=2|Joseph Matheson35419.94%
|rowspan=2|
|rowspan=2|
|rowspan=2 |
|rowspan=2|Alexander McCuish
|-
|
|Alexander McCuish32618.37%
|-
| rowspan="2"|Victoria
||
|John Archibald McDonald87432.94%
|
|D.J. McLeod49818.77%
|
|John Munroe1595.99%
||
|John Morrison
|-	
|
|John Morrison52219.68%	
||
|William F. McCurdy60022.62%
|
|
||
|William F. McCurdy
|-
|}

References

1882
1882 elections in Canada
1882 in Nova Scotia
June 1882 events